Algorythum is the fifth studio album by Mentallo & The Fixer, released on February 16, 1999 by Metropolis Records. It was the band's first release without founding member Dwayne Dassing and was commemorated to his sister Danielle Dassing.

Reception

Steve Huey of AllMusic said "although the group's overall sound hasn't changed much without Dwayne, since Gary composed most of their best-known songs, there is a slightly more adventurous quality to the record, even if there are no radical rethinkings." Last Sigh Magazine called the album a "peaceful overall work of music with a touch of noise, a good deal of programming on the more gentle side of things and some experimental in terms of how the release congeals in continuity to bring about a new direction for Mentallo & The Fixer." Ink 19 commended the band's new direction despite losing a member.

Track listing

Personnel
Adapted from the Algorythum liner notes.

Mentallo & The Fixer
 Gary Dassing (as Mentallo) – vocals, synthesizer, sampler, guitar, drum programming, sequencing, mastering, recording, engineering, mixing

Additional musicians
 John Bustamante – vocals (2, 5, 7, 8), additional synthesizer (1)
 Todd Kreth – electric guitar and bass guitar (11)
 Jon Pyre – vocals (1, 3, 4, 6, 9), additional sequencing and additional programming (12)

Production and design
 Chris Cline – mastering, recording, live drums (1-3, 5, 6, 8), sampler (9), acoustic guitar (11)
 Carlos Rosales – cover art, design

Release history

References

External links 
 

1999 albums
Mentallo & The Fixer albums
Metropolis Records albums
Off Beat (label) albums